The Yuba–Sutter area (common name), or Yuba City Metropolitan Statistical Area (name given by the U.S. Census Bureau), is a smaller metropolitan community including Yuba and Sutter Counties in Northern California's Central Valley within the Greater Sacramento area.

The area is anchored by Yuba City, California, the county seat of Sutter County and, to a lesser extent, Marysville, California, the county seat of Yuba County.

Communities

Places with more than 50,000 inhabitants
Sutter County
 Yuba City (Principal city)

Places with 10,000 to 50,000 inhabitantats
Yuba County
 Marysville (incorporated city)
 Olivehurst (census-designated place)
 Linda (census-designated place)

Places with 1,000 to 10,000 inhabitants
Sutter County
 Live Oak (incorporated city)
 South Yuba City (census-designated place)
 Tierra Buena (census-designated place)
 Sutter (census-designated place)

Yuba County
 Beale Air Force Base (census-designated place)
 Brownsville (census-designated place)
 Challenge-Brownsville (census-designated place)
 Loma Rica (census-designated place)
 Plumas Lake (census-designated place)
 Wheatland (incorporated city)

Places with 500 to 1,000 inhabitants
Sutter County
 Meridian (census-designated place)
 Rio Oso (census-designated place)

Yuba County
 Dobbins (census-designated place)

Yuba–Sutter Fair
Located in the Sacramento Valley, the 13th District Agricultural Association better known as the Yuba–Sutter Fair is long on history and tradition. The first fair was held in Marysville, Yuba County and was actually the California State Fair in August 1858. Agricultural societies were organized and the first state fairs were held on a rotating basis. The first state fair was held in San Francisco in 1854, the second in Sacramento, the third in San Jose, the fourth in Stockton and the fifth in Marysville. Thereafter, the state fair was held annually in Sacramento; however, the district fair continued to be held at the pavilion erected at Cortez Square in Marysville. There were 16 fairs held between the years 1858 and 1879. The district fairs were held until the start of the 20th century and then continuity of fair activities is difficult to trace. Sometime in this era, the idea of holding a county fair replaced the district plan. In the 1920s, noteworthy fairs were held near Browns Valley and the community of Arboga. Originally, the 13th District Agricultural Association comprised Yuba, Sutter, Yolo and Sacramento counties. Decentralization resulted in the exclusion of Sacramento County in 1889 and Yolo County left in 1893.

In the early 1930s, a group of interested citizens established a rodeo arena at the Flying I Ranch in the Arboga District. A half-mile racetrack plus pens and a building for livestock exhibits was constructed. At the same time, other exhibits were displayed in the Yuba county Memorial Auditorium. This was used for the annual fairs and rodeo until 1940. Later it was deemed advisable to obtain a site more centrally located and convenient to the residents of Marysville and Yuba City. Consequently, in July 1941 a  tract of land at our current site was purchased for $1,020. Activities were halted abruptly during the war years. Additional adjacent land was purchased and the fair has been held annually since 1945, although the severe flood of 1955 curtailed operations that year.

Today the 13th District Agricultural Fair is one of fifty-four district agricultural associations. Twenty-four county fairs, two citrus fairs and the state fair make up the 81 State Fair system.

Concert venues
 Toyota Amphitheater (formerly the Sleep Train Amphiteater)
 Marysville Pavilion

Beale Air Force Base
See Beale Air Force Base

Education

Colleges and universities
 Yuba Community College District
 Chapman University
 Cambridge Career College

High schools
 Yuba City High School
 Marysville High School
 River Valley High School
 Lindhurst High School
 Sutter Union High School
 Live Oak High School
 Wheatland High School
 Faith Christian High School
 Three Rivers High School
 East Nicolaus High School
 Pierce High School
 Marysville Charter Academy for the Arts

Sights, museums, recreation and shopping

 Sunsweet Growers Incorporated
 Marysville Gold Sox 
 Sutter Buttes
 Bryant Field
 Bok Kai Temple - built in 1888 to replace the first temple built in the early 1850s, this temple has been a Chinese community project since 1866
 Sutter Hock Farm
 Marysville High School - Oldest high school in western U.S.
 Ellis Lake 
 Community Memorial Museum of Sutter County
 Mary Aaron Memorial Museum
 Museum of the Forgotten Warriors
 Yuba Feather Historical Museum
 Edward F. Beale Museum
 Yuba Sutter Mall
 Riverfront Park
 Sutter/Yuba Friday Night Live

Media

Newspaper
 Appeal-Democrat- The Appeal-Democrat is one of many of the National daily newspapers that were formally owned by Freedom Communications. More specifically, it is the daily local newspaper for Sutter and Yuba county as well as neighboring communities. The Appeal-Democrat has been circulating throughout this region since 1926 when the Marysville Appeal (founded in 1860) and the Marysville Evening Democrat (founded in 1884) merged.  See Appeal-Democrat
 Territorial Dispatch
 The Nor-Cal Paper thenorcalpaper.org Was a weekly full size and full color newspaper from 1997 to 2005 then went strictly to an on-line news and opinions publication. Created by RW Gless, a former Marysville City Councilman from 1992 to 1996, as an Open Forum of news and opinions which allowed people to post views that other medias would not allow or refuse to print. The Nor-Cal Paper started in 1997 as a weekly full size newspaper and went on-line in 2008 as the same news & opinions publication that can be found at; tncp99.wix.com/the-nor-cal-paper. In 2014 R.W.GLESS also went into Writing Books. Thee Great American Illusion, The Government Agenda, and Complacent Ignorant Apathy, A Recipe For America's Doom, available at Amazon Books and Tower Books as well as other book dealers.

Radio

FM
 KETQ-LP 93.3
 KKCY 103.1
 KXJS 88.7
 KRCX 99.9
 KRYC 105.9

AM
 KMYC 1410
 KOBO 1450
 KUBA 1600

Television
 Comcast Cable North Valley Television NVTV
 MySYtv.com Sutter Yuba Television Magazine

Hospitals
 Rideout Memorial Hospital - Marysville, California
 Fremont Memorial Hospital - Yuba City, California

See also
 Yuba–Sutter Regional Arts Council
 Sacramento Valley
 List of Registered Historic Places in California

Metropolitan areas of California
Sacramento metropolitan area
.
Geography of the Sacramento Valley
Marysville, California
Sutter County, California
Yuba County, California